Minister of Foreign Affairs of Mauritius is a cabinet minister in charge of the Ministry of Foreign Affairs of Mauritius, responsible for conducting foreign relations of the country.

The following is a list of foreign ministers of Mauritius since its founding in 1968:

References

Foreign
Foreign Ministers
Politicians
Foreign relations of Mauritius